The Lord President of the Court of Session and Lord Justice General is the most senior judge in Scotland, the head of the judiciary, and the presiding judge of the College of Justice, the Court of Session, and the High Court of Justiciary. The Lord President holds the title of Lord Justice General of Scotland and the head of the High Court of Justiciary ex officio, as the two offices were combined in 1836.  The Lord President has authority over any court established under Scots law, except for the Supreme Court of the United Kingdom and the Court of the Lord Lyon.

The current Lord President of the Court of Session is Lord Carloway, who was appointed to the position on 18 December 2015. They are paid according to salary group 1.1 of the Judicial Salaries Scale, which in 2016 was £222,862.

Remit and jurisdiction

Head of the judiciary 
As Lord President of the Court of Session and is the most senior judge in Scotland, the head of the judiciary, and the presiding judge of the College of Justice, and the Court of Session. Under Section 2(6) of the Judiciary and Courts (Scotland) Act 2008, the Lord President has authority over the judiciary of any court established under Scots law, except for the Supreme Court of the United Kingdom and the Court of the Lord Lyon. The Scottish Land Court, which until 1 April 2017 was administered separately, was transferred to the Scottish Courts and Tribunals Service. The 2008 act states:

The Lord President is supported by the Judicial Office for Scotland which was established on 1 April 2010 as a result of the Judiciary and Courts (Scotland) Act 2008, and the Lord President chairs the corporate board of the Scottish Courts and Tribunals Service. The Lord President, and the wider judiciary, is advised on matters relating to the administration of justice by the Judicial Council for Scotland, which is a non-statutory body established in 2007. There had been plans for a statutory judges' council but these plans were abandoned in favour of a non-statutory council convened by the Lord President.

Inner House 
The Lord President presides over the 1st Division of the Inner House of the Court of Session. The Inner House is the part of the Court of Session which acts as a court of appeal for cases decided the Outer House and Sheriff Appeal Court, and hearing appeals on questions of law from the Sheriff Appeal Court, Scottish Land Court, Court of the Lord Lyon, and the Lands Tribunal for Scotland.

Official Oath 
In Scotland the Official Oath is taken before the Lord President of the Court of Session.

Lord Justice General
The Lord President is also the Lord Justice General of Scotland and the head of the High Court of Justiciary ex officio, with the two offices having been combined in 1836.The office of Lord Justice General is derived from the justiciars who were appointed from at least the twelfth century. From around 1567 onwards it was held heritably by the Earl of Argyll until the heritability was resigned to the Crown in 1607.

Officeholders

Justiciars 

(called Lord Chief Justices by Scot of Scotstarvet).

 Argadus, Captain of Argyll, in the reign of Ethodius
 Comes Dunetus; in the reign of King William the Lion. (Donnchad II, Earl of Fife)
 William Comyn
 Richard Comyn
 David, Earl of Huntingdon (died 1219)
 Walter Clifford, Justiciary of the Lothians
 1216: Allan, Justiciary to King Alexander II
 1224: William Cumin, Earl of Buchan 
 Walter (died 1241), son of Allan High Steward of Scotland
 1239: William, Earl of Ross, "Lord Chief Justice of Scotland"
 Alexander (d.1283), High Steward of Scotland to King Alexander II
 1253: Alexander Cumin, Earl of Buchan
 1366: Robert de Erskine, Justiciary South of the Forth for King David II
 bef 1372: Alan de Lawedre of The Bass, Whitslaid, & Haltoun, Justiciary South of the Forth, (he received a pension for holding this post in 1374).
 1437: James Douglas, Earl of Avondale and Lord Balveny
 1446: Patrick de Ogilvy, Justiciary South of the Forth
 1457: John, Lord Lindsay of the Byres, Justiciary South of the Forth
 William Sinclair, 3rd Earl of Orkney & Caithness (d.1480), Justiciary North of the Forth for King James II
 1477: John Haldane of Gleneagles, Justiciary North of the Forth
 Patrick Hepburn, 1st Lord Hailes (died after 1482), and Robert, 2nd Lord Lyle, Justiciaries South of the Forth
 Andrew, Earl of Crawfurd, and George Gordon, 2nd Earl of Huntly, Justiciaries North of the Forth
 1488: Robert Lyle, 2nd Lord Lyle (died c. 1497), "Lord Chief Justice"
 1489: John Lyon, 3rd Lord Glamis (died 1 April 1497), and John Drummond, 1st Lord Drummond: "Justice-General"
 1492: Robert Lyle, 2nd Lord Lyle, and John Lyon, 3rd Lord Glamis
 1494: John Drummond, 1st Lord Drummond (died c1519)
 1504: Andrew Gray, 2nd Lord Gray, and John Kennedy, 2nd Lord Kennedy
 1514: Colin Campbell, 3rd Earl of Argyll
 1526: Archibald Douglas of Kilspindie
 1532: Alexander Mylne, Abbot of Cambuskenneth
 1537: Archibald Campbell, 4th Earl of Argyll
 1567: Sir Colin Campbell, 6th Earl of Argyll, (d.1584) (heritably)
 1578: Sir Colin Campbell, 6th Earl of Argyll, (re-appointment?)
 1589: Archibald Campbell, 7th Earl of Argyll, (who exchanged the heritable office of Lord Chief Justice in 1607, for the heritable Lieutenancy of Argyll and Lorn, and most of The Isles).

Lord Justice-General

Lord President

See also
List of Senators of the College of Justice
List of Leading Scottish Legal Cases

References

 
Lists of judges in Scotland